Agonidium strenuum is a species of ground beetle in the subfamily Platyninae. It was described by Maximilien Chaudoir in 1876.

References

strenuum
Beetles described in 1876